

Teams that have played in Des Moines, Iowa
Des Moines, Western Association (19th century)
Des Moines Hawkeyes, Western League (1900)
Des Moines Millers, Western League (1901)
Des Moines Midgets, Western League (1902)
Des Moines Undertakers, Western League (1903)
Des Moines Prohibitionists, Western League (1904)
Des Moines Underwriters, Western League (1905)
Des Moines Champs, Western League (1906–1907)
Des Moines Boosters, Western League (1908–1924)
All Nations, Negro leagues (1912–1918)
Des Moines Demons, Western League (1925–1937)
Des Moines Bruins, Western League (1947–1958)
Des Moines Demons, Three-I League (1959–1961)
Des Moines Oak Leafs, United States Hockey League (1961–1963), International Hockey League (1963–1972)
Des Moines Capitols, International Hockey League (1972–1975)
Iowa Cubs, American Association (1969–1997), Pacific Coast League (1998–2020), Triple-A East (2021-present)
Des Moines Buccaneers, United States Hockey League (1980–present)
Des Moines Menace, USL League Two (1994–present)
Iowa Barnstormers, Arena Football League (1995–2000, 2010–2014), af2 (2001, 2008–2009), Indoor Football League (2015–present)
Des Moines Dragons, International Basketball Association (1997–2001)
Iowa Stars, aka Iowa Chops, American Hockey League, (2005–2009)
Des Moines Heat, International Basketball League, 2005
Iowa Wolves, NBA G League (2007–present)
Des Moines Derby Dames, Women's Flat Track Derby Association (2009–present)
Iowa Wild, American Hockey League, (2013–present)

Sports in Des Moines, Iowa
Des Moines
Teams